Porrassa may refer to:

 Isla de sa Porrassa, island off the coast of Majorca, Spain
 La Porrassa, farm town on Majorca, Spain